The Juscelino Kubitschek Arena is the indoor multisport stadium of Minas Tênis Clube. The name is a homage to the former Belo Horizonte's mayor, former Minas Gerais governor and former Brazilian president Juscelino Kubitschek. The stadium is also called Minas Tênis Clube Arena. Previously, it was also called Telemig Celular Arena and Vivo Arena due to naming rights.

It is located in Lourdes neighborhood in Belo Horizonte, Brazil, and is part of the Minas I complex, the club's headquarter.  The stadium occupies an area of more than 7.000 m². Its capacity can reach up to 5,000 spectators, varying in the type of event it is hosting.

Sports venues in Belo Horizonte